ACPC may refer to:
 Animal Crossing: Pocket Camp
 American Committee for Peace in Chechnya
 Always Connected PC, a type of Microsoft PCs which will always remain online